"Story of My Life" is a 1990 song by Social Distortion, written by Mike Ness, which was released as a single and also appeared on their self-titled album as well as Live at the Roxy. The song describes looking back wistfully on life, a love interest he had as a teenager, and how things have changed and how quickly his life (and the opportunity) has passed him by.

Track listing
"Story of My Life"
"1945"
"Mommy's Little Monster"
"Pretty Thing"
"Shame on Me"

Personnel
Mike Ness – vocals, lead guitar
Dennis Danell – rhythm guitar, backing vocals
John Maurer – bass guitar, backing vocals
Christopher Reece – drums

TV, movie, and video game appearances
 Theme song for the short-lived TV show Surviving Jack
 Reality Bites, starring Winona Ryder
 Orange County, starring Colin Hanks and Jack Black
 Life or Something Like It, starring Angelina Jolie
 The Break-Up, starring Vince Vaughn and Jennifer Aniston
 Trailer for [[Stranger than Fiction (2006 film)|Stranger than Fiction]]
 The Hammer, starring Adam Carolla (Live at the Roxy version)
 Guitar Hero III: Legends of Rock (cover version by WaveGroup)
 Downloadable Content for Rock Band 2 (2007 re-recording)
 Rocksmith 2014, as Downloadable Content
 Love, in the fourth episode of season one, "Party in the Hills."

Covers
Reel Big Fish – We're Not Happy 'til You're Not Happy (2005)

References

External links
QuickTime Video at SocialDistortion.com
QuickTime Audio at SocialDistortion.com

1990 songs
1990 singles
Story of My Life
Songs written by Mike Ness
Epic Records singles
Songs about loneliness